Robert Baxter "Bobby" Gordon (5 September 1923 – 20 October 2001), was a Scottish footballer who played as an inside forward in the Football League.

References

External links

1923 births
2001 deaths
Scottish footballers
Armadale Thistle F.C. players
Kilmarnock F.C. players
Millwall F.C. players
English Football League players
Scottish Football League players
Association football inside forwards
People from Ormiston